James White (21 August 1899 – August 1983), also known as Jimmy White or Tec White, is a Scottish former footballer who spent most of his career playing for Fall River Marksmen in the American Soccer League. He was born in Airdrie, North Lanarkshire, Scotland.

Playing career
In 1920, White signed with Albion Rovers of the Scottish League and helped them reach the 1920 Scottish Cup Final where they lost to Kilmarnock; his brother Jock was also in the side (two other brothers, Willie and Tom, were also footballers – all four played together for Heart of Midlothian in the Lord Provost's Rent Relief Cup final of 1923 which their side won through two goals from Jock). He spent two seasons with Albion before joining Maidstone United of the English Southern League in 1923. After one season with Maidstone, White transferred to Motherwell.

White was one of several players who were recruited from the Scottish League by Sam Mark to play for Fall River Marksmen. Others included Tommy Martin, also from Motherwell, Charlie McGill from Third Lanark and wing-half Bill McPherson from Beith. These players would become the backbone of the a very successful Marksmen team during the 1920s and early 1930s. In later seasons his teammates also included, among others, Billy Gonsalves, Bert Patenaude, Werner Nilsen and Alex McNab.

Between 1925 and 1931, White made 243 league appearances and scored 111 goals for the Marksmen in the American Soccer League, helping them win five league titles. He also helped them win the National Challenge Cup three times, scoring twice goals in the 1927 final against Holley Carburetor F.C.
. He also played for the Marksmen in friendlies against Rangers and Kilmarnock and in 1930 was a member of the Marksmen squad that toured Central Europe.

In 1931 when Sam Mark relocated and merged the Marksmen franchise twice, White followed the team on both occasions. They first moved to New York City, where they merged with New York Soccer Club and became the New York Yankees. In the summer of 1931, White played for a Yankees team featuring Billy Gonsalves, Bert Patenaude and George Moorhouse that twice played Celtic in friendlies. On 30 May at Fenway Park the Yankees won 4–3. However, on 28 June at Yankee Stadium, Celtic won the second game 4–1. The Yankees then moved to New Bedford, Massachusetts where they merged with Fall River F.C. to become the New Bedford Whalers. With the Whalers, White won a further two American Soccer League titles and the 1932 National Challenge Cup. On 3 April 1932 he scored the opening goal in a 5–2 win against Stix, Bear and Fuller in the second leg of the final.

Honours
Fall River Marksmen

American Soccer League
Winners  1925–26, 1928–29, Fall 1929, Spring 1930, Fall 1930:  5
National Challenge Cup
Winners 1927, 1930, 1931: 3
Lewis Cup
Winners 1930: 1
Runners Up 1925: 1
American Cup
Runners Up 1924: 1

New Bedford Whalers

American Soccer League
Winners Fall 1931, Spring 1932: 2
National Challenge Cup
Winners 1932: 1

References

1899 births
1983 deaths
Scottish footballers
Scottish expatriate footballers
Albion Rovers F.C. players
Maidstone United F.C. (1897) players
Motherwell F.C. players
American Soccer League (1921–1933) players
Fall River Marksmen players
New York Yankees (soccer) players
New Bedford Whalers players
American Soccer League (1933–1983) players
New York Brookhattan players
Footballers from Airdrie, North Lanarkshire
Association football forwards
Association football midfielders
Scottish expatriate sportspeople in the United States
Expatriate soccer players in the United States
People from Assonet, Massachusetts
Scottish emigrants to the United States
Scottish Football League players